The 1973 Nicholls State Colonels football team represented Nicholls State University as a member of the Gulf South Conference (GSC) during the 1973 NCAA Division II football season. Led by Gary Kinchen in his second and final seasons as head coach, the Colonels compiled an overall record of 2–9 with a mark of 2–7 in conference play, placing ninth in the GSC. Nicholls State played home games at John L. Guidry Stadium in Thibodaux, Louisiana.

Schedule

References

Nicholls State
Nicholls Colonels football seasons
Nicholls State Colonels football